The 2008 Danmark Rundt was a men's road bicycle race held from 30 July to 3 August 2008. It was the 18th edition of the men's stage race, which was established in 1985. The race was won by Danish rider Jakob Fuglsang of Team Saxo Bank. Steve Cummings of Barloworld finished second by nine seconds with Tom Stamsnijder of Team Gerolsteiner third.

Schedule

Teams
Fifteen teams took part in the 2008 race.

Final classifications
Danish rider Jakob Fuglsang won the race by nine seconds from Steve Cummings. Tom Stamsnijder was placed third.

The points winner was Matti Breschel with Kristoffer Gudmund Nielsen the winner of the mountains classification for best climber. Fuglsang also won the white jersey for the best young rider award and Martin Mortensen was awarded the fighters award for the race. Team CSC Saxo Bank won the overall team competition from Team Columbia with Team Gerolsteiner in third place.

References

Danmark Rundt
Danmark Rundt
Danmark Rundt